Upernivik Island is an uninhabited island in Avannaata municipality in northwestern Greenland.

Geography

The island is very mountainous. Its highest point is Palup Qaqaa, an ultra-prominent peak at 71° 20' 24 N, 52° 48' 37 W reaching .

See also
List of islands of Greenland

References

External links

Uninhabited islands of Greenland
Uummannaq Fjord